RV Manta is an American research vessel in service with the National Oceanic and Atmospheric Administration as the primary maritime vessel of the Flower Garden Banks National Marine Sanctuary.

Description 
The ship is designed to have the space and equipment for up to twenty divers, including a recompression chamber and three dive showers. On board is a single Polaris RHIB and two lifeboats. The ship has a crew of 14 and can accommodate up to 25 passengers.

Manta is propelled by two Caterpillar diesel engines which each provide 1,600 horsepower for an average speed of 10.8 knots and a maximum range of 650 nautical miles.

History 
The NOAA ordered a new small research vessel in 2004, with Teknicraft of New Zealand designing the ship. In May 2007, All American Marine began construction of the ship in Washington state, and launched the vessel on 15 January 2008. Following sea trials, the ship was christened Manta in Galveston, Texas, on 27 June 2008.

Beginning in June 2008, Manta was the research and monitoring vessel of the Flower Garden Banks National Maritime Sanctuary in the Northwestern Gulf of Mexico. The ship also acts as a host for educational trips and is a standby vessel for emergency response.

References 

2008 ships
Ships of the National Oceanic and Atmospheric Administration